In geometric measure theory, Falconer's conjecture, named after Kenneth Falconer, is an unsolved problem concerning the sets of Euclidean distances between points in compact -dimensional spaces. Intuitively, it states that a set of points that is large in its Hausdorff dimension must determine a set of distances that is large in measure.

Formulation and motivation
 proved that Borel sets with Hausdorff dimension greater than  have distance sets with nonzero measure. It may also be seen as a continuous analogue of the Erdős distinct distances problem, which states that large finite sets of points must have large numbers of distinct distances.

Partial results
 proved that compact sets of points whose Hausdorff dimension is greater than  have distance sets with nonzero measure; for large values of  this approximates the threshold on Hausdorff dimension given by the Falconer conjecture. For points in the Euclidean plane, Borel sets of Hausdorff dimension greater than 5/4 have distance sets with nonzero measure and, more strongly, they have a point such that the Lebesgue measure of the distances from the set to this point is positive.

A variant of Falconer's conjecture states that, for points in the plane, a compact set whose Hausdorff dimension is greater than or equal to one must have a distance set of Hausdorff dimension one. This follows from the results on measure for sets of Hausdorff dimension greater than 5/4. For a compact planar set with Hausdorff dimension at least one, the distance set must have Hausdorff dimension at least 1/2.

Related conjectures
Proving a bound strictly greater than 1/2 for the dimension of the distance set in the case of compact planar sets with Hausdorff dimension at least one would be equivalent to resolving several other unsolved conjectures. These include a conjecture of Paul Erdős on the existence of Borel subrings of the real numbers with fractional Hausdorff dimension, and a variant of the Kakeya set problem on the Hausdorff dimension of sets such that, for every possible direction, there is a line segment whose intersection with the set has high Hausdorff dimension.
These conjectures were solved by Bourgain.

Other distance functions
For non-Euclidean distance functions in the plane defined by polygonal norms, the analogue of the Falconer conjecture is false: there exist sets of Hausdorff dimension two whose distance sets have measure zero.

References

Measure theory
Dimension theory
Metric geometry
Conjectures
Unsolved problems in geometry